Stictea glaucothoe is a moth of the family Tortricidae. It was described by Edward Meyrick in 1927. It is found on Fiji and Samoa.

References

 Strepsicrates glaucothoe in gwannon

Moths described in 1927
Olethreutini